Glücksburg is a small town northeast of Flensburg in the district Schleswig-Flensburg, in Schleswig-Holstein, Germany and is the northernmost town in Germany.

It is situated on the south side of the Flensborg Fjord, an inlet of the Baltic Sea, approx. 10 km northeast of Flensburg. The town was originally the home of the family Schleswig-Holstein-Sonderburg-Glücksburg (or simply Glücksburg), members of which have reigned in the past in Greece and several northern German states. Members of the family still reign in Denmark and Norway since 1863 and 1905 respectively.

Glücksburg was home to a German Navy base. Among the facilities at the base is the transmitter, callsign DHJ58. DHJ58, situated at 54° 50'N and  9° 32' E, ceased its transmissions on longwave frequency 68.9 kHz in 2002 and in 2004 its longwave antenna was disassembled.

Notable people

 Kai-Uwe von Hassel (1913-1997), politician (CDU), was mayor of Glücksburg, Minister President of Schleswig-Holstein, Federal Minister, President of the Bundestag
 Gui Bonsiepe (born 1934), designer and design theorist

References

External links

Seaside resorts in Germany
Schleswig-Flensburg
Populated coastal places in Germany (Baltic Sea)